{{Automatic taxobox
| fossil_range = 
| image = MBNMS - Juvenile Vampire Squid (27667875204).jpg
| image_caption = Juvenile vampire squid (Vampyroteuthis)
| parent_authority = Jeletzky, 1965
| taxon = Vampyroteuthidae
| authority = Thiele in Chun, 1915
| subdivision_ranks = Genera
| subdivision = 
†Necroteuthis
†Provampyroteuthis
†Vampyronassa
Vampyroteuthis
| synonyms = 
MelanoteuthidaeGrimpe, 1917
WatasellidaeSasaki, 1920
NecroteuthidaeKretzoi, 1942
}}

Vampyroteuthidae is a family of vampyromorph cephalopods containing the extant vampire squid, Vampyroteuthis infernalis, and the extinct genera Necroteuthis, Provampyroteuthis, and Vampyronassa''.

References

Octopodiformes
Cephalopod families
Extant Middle Jurassic first appearances
Taxa named by Johannes Thiele (zoologist)